The medium-tailed brush-furred rat (Lophuromys medicaudatus) is a species of rodent in the family Muridae. It has been recorded from the Democratic Republic of the Congo, Rwanda, and Uganda. It lives in rainforest and swamps. It is a rare species which is threatened by habitat loss.

Notes

References

Lophuromys
Mammals described in 1975
Taxonomy articles created by Polbot